Lensing is a surname. Notable people with the surname include:

Kees Lensing (born 1978), Namibian rugby union player
Vicki Lensing (born 1957), American politician
Wilhelmina Elisabeth Lensing (1847–1925), Dutch feminist, politician and writer

See also
Lens (optics)
Gravitational lensing, bending of light by a mass
Thermal lensing, an atmospheric effect on laser beams
Michelle Lensink (born 1970), Australian politician, Minister for Human Services

de:Lensing